North Sydney High School may refer to:

 North Sydney Girls High School
 North Sydney Boys High School